El Chavo del Ocho, often shortened to El Chavo, is a Mexican television sitcom created by Roberto Gómez Bolaños. The show was based on a series of sketches performed on Gómez's eponymous sketch show, Chespirito, which were first performed in 1971. El Chavo became its own series in 1973 and aired until 1980, becoming one of the most popular television programs in the world. Following its cancellation and the relaunch of Chespirito, the El Chavo sketches returned in 1980 and continued to be performed on Chespirito until 1992 when Gómez, by this point in his sixties, discontinued them due to his advancing age.

The show follows the life and tribulations of the title character, a poor orphan child (played by Gómez Bolaños) that lives on a Mexican housing complex, typically called a vecindad. He is accompanied by a cast of neighbors, children, and other characters. All the characters, including the children, were played by adults on El Chavo.

Summary

Main characters

El Chavo
Portrayed by Roberto Gómez Bolaños
Years: 1972–1992

El Chavo del Ocho is an eight-year-old orphan and the main character of the series. "Chavo" is a Mexican Spanish slang for "kid"; Chavo's real name is not known, but is supposed to be Chente, short for Vicente, after a supposed friend that nobody has ever met and according to Chavo, looks a lot like himself. Generally Chavo is enthusiastic, creative and good-natured, but on the other hand he is also rather naïve and very gullible. He is not particularly bright (which Roberto Gómez Bolaños insinuated on the launch of the animated series may be a consequence of poor nutrition) and is remarkably clumsy, often hitting Quico, Don Ramón and Señor Barriga with balls, brooms, shoes, hammers, bricks, chairs and other objects. Chavo's typical attire consists of a green plaid baseball cap with ear flaps, a striped t-shirt, khaki shorts held up by a pair of orange suspenders he wears with both straps over one shoulder, and brown shoes without socks.

Chavo arrived at the neighborhood at the age of four and apparently lived in apartment #8 with an elderly woman (who is never seen, but is mentioned in the novel El diario de El Chavo del 8). After her death, Chavo spends most of his time inside an abandoned barrel that he calls his "secret hideout". He has a craving for ham tortas, a popular kind of sandwich in Mexico. He has a crush on Paty, along with Quico (which is their first fight over their crush, although she kisses Chavo in the animated series). Despite being a hungry 8-year-old child, he seems to have an incredible physical strength, since his punches are able to stun or even topple a full-grown man, mostly Don Ramón.

In the English dub version of the series, he is voiced by Mona Marshall in animated and Scott Menville in the original. Unlike in the original series and the Spanish version of the animated series, instead of being called "Chente" or "Chavito", he is called "Chavorino" by his friends sometimes. Also, the "El" part of his name was officially removed from his character's bios in the animated series, possibly to keep in with the show's English production on Americanizing the series. Instead of ham tortas, he has a craving for ham sandwiches, although the Christmas specials state that he also has cravings for jelly sandwiches for mysterious reasons, but those jelly sandwiches are actually ham tortas (ham sandwiches) in the original Spanish version, called jelly sandwiches in the English version. Also, his friend "Vicente" (or Chente) is renamed as Chova (switching the A and the O around).

In Brazil, his name was changed to Chaves, which means "Keys" in Portuguese, because the word chavo does not make sense in this language. Actually, Chaves is a Portuguese language surname, with a Spanish language version, spelled Chávez.

La Chilindrina
Portrayed by María Antonieta de las Nieves
Years: 1972–1973, 1975–1980, 1980–1992

La Chilindrina is the daughter of Don Ramón. "Precocious" is the best way to describe Don Ramón's intelligent and mischievous daughter, who likes to take advantage of her slow-witted friends to play pranks on them and take their toys or snacks. She usually wears a short green-patterned dress, white shorts, and a red sweater that is always twisted on the back. She has freckles, horn-rimmed eyeglasses, a missing front tooth, and two pigtails that are always uneven, one significantly higher than the other one, just like her socks. "Chilindrina" is the name of a typical Mexican bun, with brown sugar sparkles on top, reminiscent of the character's freckles. In early episodes, La Chilindrina used to have longer ponytails which were cut by El Chavo. In most episodes, she is seen to have a crush on Chavo, and is very jealous of his crush on Paty.

La Chilindrina was cut from the El Chavo animated series due to disputes with Roberto Gomez Bolaños (creator of all El Chavo characters) and Maria Antonieta de las Nieves (Chilindrina's portrayer) about who owned the rights to the character and if the character was allowed to be used publicly outside of El Chavo. María Antonieta de las Nieves was able to win a legal battle over Chespirito in 2003, which gave her permission to act as La Chilindrina in public, and granted her rights over the character so that character is separated from the cast but still be on it by the fans. She was replaced by Ñoño (Junior) in the animated series version, who came to have her same mischievous personality.

In Brazil, her name was changed to Chiquinha, a diminutive for Chica, which in turn is a nickname for Francisca.

Quico
Portrayed by Carlos Villagrán
Years: 1972–1978+

Federico Matalascallando Corcuera, known as Quico, is a spoiled, greedy, overprotected 9-year-old boy, son of Doña Florinda and a late naval captain (also named Federico), who reportedly died when his vessel was attacked and, according to Quico, was eaten by a white shark. Arrogant, manipulative, and envious, Quico always wants to draw everyone's attention to himself, either by screaming loudly or by showing off his newest toy. Because of this, he usually gets El Chavo in trouble when he does something wrong, especially to Don Ramón, after which Don Ramón hits El Chavo angrily on the head. Partially due to his mother's influence (and former wealth and status as the wife of a naval officer), he believes that he and his mother are superior to everyone else in the neighborhood. He still finds time to play with—as he and his mother call them – chusma ("riffraff"), namely Chavo, Chilindrina, and Don Ramón. However, Quico has proved many times to be Chavo's best friend, often assisting him in Chavo's mischievous acts, as seen due to the fact that they are mostly seen playing together in the front yard, and that he was genuinely hurt when El Chavo left La Vecindad in the episodes "El Ratero de la Vecindad" and "El Billete de Loteria". Moreover, Quico is a good kid deep inside, even though there are several occasions in which he acts self-centered. Quico wears a rainbow-colored beanie cap, a dark blue naval officer's shirt with a red ascot, bright yellow socks he pulls all the way up to his knees, and white low-top shoes. He is also widely identified by his enormous cheeks, which he can puff out quite largely, and his minuscule intelligence, often responding to the Spanish words for idiot, stupid, dummy, etc. (he even displays delight about being called such things, oblivious to the fact that all these words are insults). Despite his stupidity, Quico displays more deceptive abilities and common sense than Chavo, and is the most likely to break the fourth wall (especially regarding that four of his quotes do this so). Often in the series Quico mentions that he has or that his mom will buy him a "square ball" and in "Termina el Romance" he and El Chavo refused to help Professor Jirafales reconcile with his mother due to Professor Jirafales having promised to them a square ball. In 1979, when Carlos Villagran quit the show, Quico is said (in the episode named "Vámonos al Cinema?") to have gone off to live with his rich godmother, reportedly "unable to stand the riffraff anymore." No one in the show ever talked about him afterwards, or said anything about his absence, as if he had never existed. Villagran's character, Quico, starred in a rather short-lived spin-off series, ¡Ah qué Kiko! in the late 1980s, which attempted to revive the series using a "hip-hop" twist and gave Villagran's character a slight wardrobe make-over.

In the English dub version of the original and animated series, the main role is sometimes as the antagonist, he is voiced by Doug Erholtz in animated and Adam DeVine in the original. Instead of being called "Tesoro" (treasure/darling), he is called "Muffin".

Don Ramón
Portrayed by Ramón Valdés
Years: 1972–1979, 1981.

Don Ramón is an unemployed widower with a very lanky, nearly emaciated build. Sometime before the series started he was married to his wife and lived in the neighborhood together. As a result of the marriage they had their daughter, Chilindrina. But unfortunately, his wife died giving birth so Don Ramon was forced to raise his daughter alone the best he could. He has black wiry hair and a moustache and is usually seen wearing a sun hat, a T-shirt, and jeans. His greatest aspiration seems to be living an uncomplicated life, but in the vecindad, this seems impossible. He is constantly hounded for the rent which he has neglected to pay for fourteen months (a figure that seems to be static since Señor Barriga forgives several months of his rent in several episodes) – however, in one episode, he did pay at least one month of rent while on the verge of eviction from Señor Barriga. His daughter (Chilindrina) is a perennial headache and his neighbor Doña Florinda's response to any imposition on her lifestyle is a loud slap on his face, which causes him to spin in a circle. He eventually became something of a scapegoat for Florinda's wrath, with her ending up slapping him when he wasn't even present when something went wrong. Although rather high-strung and quick-tempered, Don Ramón manages to keep a fairly upbeat attitude and to (just barely) make a living doing odd jobs. He's also a fan of all sports and pretends to be knowledgeable in them (having demonstrated boxing, bowling, American football, baseball and even bullfighting – with a dummy bull – to the kids), but due to the kids' own shortcomings, he always comes up short. Chavo often mispronounces his name as Ron Damón, that is a common way of spelling by children, though it seems that Don Ramón tolerates the mispronunciation as long as Chavo and other children don't give out several insults. One quote popularized by himself is "There is no bad work, the downside is having to work". He is a fan of Club Necaxa, which in the day was generally known as a perennial mid-table also-ran, per Don Ramón's quote "Yo le voy al Necaxa", meaning that he neither wished for glory nor suffering. His personality of always being a good-hearted and (not always) noble man, made Don Ramón one of the most cherished characters in the history of the show.

In Brazil he is known as Seu Madruga (literally "Mr. Dawn") and is considered to be the most popular character, with some of his quotes used under many circumstances, not only the funny ones. An example is during the 2000s that was considered the peak of success of the character in the country, Don Ramón was often used heavily as an internet meme, to the point of having several Orkut communities related to him and even fangames with him being the protagonist. In 2010 a book entitled "Seu Madruga: Vila e Obra" was published exclusively in Brazil in honor of the character and his actor showing curiosities, interviews and unpublished photos about Ramón Valdés.

In the English dub version, he was known as Mr. Raymond or nicknamed Rister Maymond by El Chavo and was, like Quico, voiced by Doug Erholtz in the animated. In the English dub of the original, he is voiced by John DiMaggio.

Doña Florinda
Portrayed by Florinda Meza
Years: 1972–1990; 1992

Florinda Corcuera y Villalpando,Viuda de Matalas Cayando, commonly referred to as Doña Florinda, is the mother of Quico and love interest of Professor Jirafales. Before the series started she was married to a naval officer and was rich. As a result of their marriage, she gave birth to Quico. She became a widow when Quico was still young. Her late husband, after whom Quico was named, was a naval officer who died at sea. It is often said by Quico that he descansa en pez (a pun on "rest in peace", literally meaning "rests in fish", indicating that he was swallowed by a shark). Her full name is Florinda Corcuera y Villalpando, viuda de (widow of) La Regueira. Doña Florinda sees herself as being socially, morally and economically superior to her neighbors (and, according to the book El Diario del Chavo del Ocho, she was indeed rich until the death of her husband, leaving her without a way to obtain money and eventually waste it, forcing her to move to the vecindad), and while not misanthropic, snobbish, or bully-like, she tends to give orders to the others, such as putting signs that ban animals and infants from the vecindad (much to Barriga's chagrin, because she does it without his authorization). She is so fiercely protective of Quico that whenever he is upset, she'll beat up Don Ramón without seeking explanation. In fact, a recurring gag in the series is that she unfairly accuses him of "attacking" Quico and goes to slap him, even when he is not present in the scene. When Villagran left the show – thus concluding Quico's presence in the vecindad – she still slaps Don Ramón, but less often. This is due to Don Ramón laughing loudly whenever a rude comment is directed towards her (mostly coming from El Chavo). She likes cleanliness and order and also likes to cook and for that reason becomes famous among her neighbours. Once she accepted a partnership selling churros (a fried pastry originating from Spain) with Don Ramón. She is easily recognized by the fact that she always keeps her hair in curlers (except in some early episodes), even at work or on vacation in Acapulco. In later episodes, she opens a restaurant called "Restaurante Doña Florinda". Derisively, the kids call her "Vieja Chancluda" ("vieja" being "old lady", and "chancluda" as someone who uses "chanclas", sandals).

In the English dubbed version, she is known as Mrs. Worthmore (a pun on worth more) and voiced by Kate Higgins in the animated and Hynden Walch in the original. Her restaurant was renamed "Mrs. Worthmore's Cafe" as well. In Brazil, her name was translated to Dona Florinda.

Profesor Jirafales
Portrayed by Rubén Aguirre
Years: 1973–1992

Professor Inocencio Jirafales is the school teacher. He is highly educated but naïve, although he carries on a ludicrously innocent relationship with Doña Florinda and patiently teaches way above the heads of his students. He is patient and professionally ethical. When angered, he shouts "Ta-ta-ta-taaaaa-TAH!!!". His last name is a reference to the very tall Aguirre, who stands at a height of 1.98 m or 6 ft 6 in ("jirafa" is Spanish for giraffe; the closest English equivalent would be Giraffald). The children (and sometimes adults, most notably Don Ramón) refer to him as "Maistro Longaniza" (being "maistro" a mispronounced form of "maestro", an alternative for "professor", both meaning "teacher", and "longaniza", a long kind of sausage). Although he appears throughout all the series (almost 20 years) having a romance with Dona Florinda, by the time it finished, neither one suggested the possibility of going beyond that idyllic relation – there's an in-joke among the series production that statizes his full name to be "Inocencio Jirafales", being "Inocencio" both a real-life name in Spanish and Portuguese-speaking countries and a play on "innocence", thus adding to the "innocent" way he treats his relationship towards Doña Florinda. Even though he claims to have a strong hatred of violence, Jirafales is more than willing to beat up Don Ramón if he does something stupid or that leaves him outraged (in the episode in which Don Ramón teaches El Chavo some basic boxing classes and even lends his boxing gloves to the kid, Jirafales has beaten him so violently that even Doña Florinda displays disgust over it).

In the English dub version, he is known as Professor Girafalde (a pun on the word giraffe) or nicknamed Professor Sausage (Maistro Longaniza) or Professor Firehose (in the Fireman episode) and even  Professor Drainpipe by El Chavo (sometimes called "Professor Girafalges" by non-marketing teams) and is voiced by Bob Buchholz in the animated and Jeff Bennett in the live action. In Brazil his name is written Professor Girafales ("girafa" is Portuguese for giraffe) and nicknamed by the children as Professor Linguiça or Mestre Linguiça (being "mestre" an alternative for "professor" and "linguiça" meaning "sausage").

Doña Clotilde
Portrayed by Angelines Fernández
Years: 1972–1990; 1992

Doña Clotilde, sometimes referred to as "La bruja del 71", is a retired woman who chases after Don Ramón. Because she is old and somewhat eccentric, the kids think she is a witch, and refer to her as "The Witch from (Apartment) 71". Some of the adults also refer to her as that, often by mistake, due to the kids frequently calling her a "witch". She refers to herself as señorita (Miss) because she has never been married, which also she gets upset by when called señora (Mrs.), meaning that she is a married woman. In one episode of the series, Chavo stated that "She's not a witch because if she were, she would use her magic to turn (herself) into a young, beautiful woman." She is a single woman, thirsty for love, and frequently seeks it with Don Ramón, who is a widower. Because she never wants people to know her real age, she is always saying the number of candles (40 candles) she had to use in her "last" birthday's cake (she never says to have more than 49) – even then, people never believe her, mostly because she also acts like a senior woman. She has always been in love with Don Ramón, her neighbor. But he is not interested in her, so Doña Clotilde tries and does everything she can to conquer him like bringing him food from the store, buying him medicine when he can't sleep, baking cakes for him, or lending him luggage. In fact, all the times that Don Ramón is "interested" in her is when she faints in the middle of the yard and was going to bring him something from the store or just when being polite with her is his only choice. When Ramon Valdes left the show, her affections turned towards Jaimito, el cartero. She is always dressed with a blue or pink hat (1950s style) with "leaves", blue gown, and black shoes. In the beginning of the series she had also a black sweater. Regarding to her income, the source is unknown. Some might suggest she receives a pension, or maybe gets her money out of an inheritance. Otherwise, it would be impossible for her to pay the rent to Señor Barriga, pay her expenses and buy all the things she gives to Don Ramón.

In the English dub version, she was renamed Miss Pinster (a pun on the word spinster) or nicknamed The Witch of 71 by the children and is voiced in the animated series by Mona Marshall, like El Chavo. In The original she is voiced by Leslie Carrara-Rudolph. In Brazil her name is Dona Clotilde or Bruxa do 71. Some sources in Spanish misspell her name as Cleotilde.

Señor Barriga
 Portrayed by Edgar Vivar
 Years: 1972–1973, 1973–1979, 1980–1990; 1992

Zenón Barriga y Pesado is the landlord of the vecindad. Bolaños states that Señor Barriga prefers going personally to receive the residents' rents in order to save up his own time or a rent collector's salary. He rarely succeeds in collecting rent from Don Ramón and is greeted upon his every arrival by being (accidentally) kicked, tripped, beaten, or hit by a flying object thrown by El Chavo. His last name is a reference to his obesity ("barriga" is both Spanish and Portuguese for "belly", but the surname actually exists). In two episodes throughout the series (the first when Don Ramón buys a bowling ball while working as a buyer/salesman of home antiques; the second when Doña Florinda first sets up a restaurant) his full name is revealed to be "Zenón Barriga y Pesado" (literally "Zeno Belly and Heavy", but Pesado is a real surname too), and "Zenón" being a pun on "Cenón" ("dining man" or "big dinner"); Zenón is also the Spanish form of Zeno. He is also well known because of his patience with Don Ramón and his unpunctual rent payments and all the kids' (mostly Chavo's) misbehavior like punching him or nicknaming him (always making fun of his obesity).

In one episode, he follows through on his eviction threat to Don Ramón, but while he is packing his belongings, Chavo and Quico come across an old scrapbook with pictures of Don Ramón as a boxer in his younger years. Barriga is overcome with emotion; as it turns out, he was heavily in debt and was about to go to jail when he desperately bet against Don Ramón in a boxing match, and won back enough money to clear his debts.

Even though he is the victim of Chavo's various pranks, he cares very deeply about him, even offering to take him to Acapulco instead of his son Ňoño, who is off on a camping trip with the Boy Scouts.

In the English dub version of the series, he is renamed Mr. Beliarge (pun on the word belly and large) and is voiced by Dave Mallow. In Brazil, his name translates to Seu Barriga (literally "Mr. Belly") or Senhor Barriga.

La Popis
 Portrayed by Florinda Meza
Doña Florinda's niece and Quico's cousin. Cutesy and dumb, Popis was usually only present in schoolroom scenes until after Quico left the series, when she filled in for his character in remakes of old episodes. She would frequently say "Acúsalo con tu mamá" ("Tell on him with your mom") sometimes at inappropriate moments, known in the English dub of the animated series as "I'm telling...", such as when Professor Jirafales told Quico that he gave the wrong answer. Whenever she says or does something wrong, she blames it on her doll, Serafina, which she loved as a daughter. In the English dub version of the series, she is renamed as Phoebe, her doll is renamed as Stephanie. She is voiced by Kate Higgins in the animated and Hynden Walch in the original. She fills in for Chilindrina in the animated series, as Chilindrina never appears or is mentioned in the series.

Ñoño
 Portrayed by Edgar Vivar
Pronounced NYO-NYO, as in yo-yo, Señor Barriga's son, he is as fat as his father, and thus is always the butt of the classroom's fat jokes. Ñoño was another classmate, but often appeared around the neighborhood if any scenes needed an extra kid. He is well-studied and good-hearted, but like most of the other kids, naïve to say the very least, so he is often taken advantage of. He also substituted for Quico in the later years. Ñoño usually gets teased by his peers due to his weight. In the English version of series, he is renamed as Junior and is voiced by Yuri Lowenthal of Ben 10 and Naruto fame in the animated, and Bobby Moynihan from Saturday Night Live fame in the original. A hard joke on him over his weight was one where Quico and Chilindrina have several balloons and Chavo, hidden in his barrel, burst the balloons first to make his friends angry at each other and then to make them cry. When Ñoño arrives, with balloons too, Chavo confuses him with a balloon and burst his belly making Ñoño to "burst" leaving only his clothes visible. In Brazil, his name was changed to Nhonho, a phonetic transcription of Ñoño for Portuguese.

Godínez
 Portrayed by Horácio Gómez Bolaños
An overall and baseball cap-wearing kid who usually keeps to himself and tries to dodge questions in the classroom so he can focus on drawing and playing musical instruments. Godínez is his surname; his given name is unknown. He seems to be a capable student but is totally uninterested. Godínez only appears on rare occasions. Horácio Gómez directed the show for a period. In real life, he was brother to Roberto, creator and writer of the series. In the English dub version of the series, he is renamed as Gordon. He is voiced by Kate Higgins in the animated series and Scott Menville in the original. Like his Spanish counterparts, Gordon is funny and makes ridiculous remarks.

Jaimito, el cartero
 Portrayed by Raúl Padilla
A sociable but forgetful and negligent postal worker who appears in a few of the last episodes and takes over for Don Ramón and Quico in the Chavo segments on the hour-long "Chespirito". Whenever he enters the vecindad, he is seen carrying an old bicycle, which he cannot ride because he couldn't learn (and he'll be instantly dismissed if he tells at the post office he doesn't know how to ride the bicycle). Jaimito also is rather lazy and tends to avoid carrying out tasks with the excuse of "avoiding fatigue" (in the English dub of the animated series, his excuse is that "his tiredness makes him tired"). He hails from Tangamandapio which, although being a real location in Mexico, is thought by fans of being just a coincidental joke (Jaimito once said that "Tangamandapio is bigger than New York; it's so big, it doesn't appear in any maps"). In the English dub version of the series, he is renamed as Manny the Mailman who comes from Upsidedowntown and is voiced by Dave Mallow in the animated and Tom Kenny in the original. In Brazil, his name was changed to Jaiminho, o carteiro and his hometown Tangamandápio.

Doña Nieves
 Portrayed by María Antonieta de las Nieves
Chilindrina's great-grandmother, and Don Ramón's grandmother (the one constantly referred to by Doña Florinda). Has character traits of both Don Ramón and Chilindrina. In some late "Chavo" episodes and early "Chespirito" episodes, she also takes over for her grandson Don Ramón. María Antonieta de las Nieves had been playing a nameless character similar to Doña Nieves for years in a variety of sketches, but she did not work particularly well in the Don Ramón role; for one thing, it was awkward that Doña Nieves and Chilindrina could not appear in scenes together except via special effects. In the series, she is renamed as Mrs. Nieves. By the late 1980s, her character had virtually disappeared from "El Chavo". In Brazil, her name was changed to Dona Neves. She has also appeared in various Dr. Chapatín sketches.

Minor characters
Doña Eduviges (Janet Arceo), only in 1973: For two episodes she lives in the upstairs apartment of the vecindad and interacts with the other characters. Except for dressing differently and living in a different apartment, she acts exactly the same as Doña Clotilde, right down to her heavy-handed flirting with Don Ramón. But obviously she was crazy, because one time she said that she dyed her hair white just because it was fashionable. The kids even call her "La Loca de la Escalera" ("The crazy lady upstairs"). In the very next episode, Doña Clotilde is back and Doña Eduviges is never mentioned again. Jaimito, el cartero is assumed to have moved into her apartment or one next to it, since he usually came from the same direction. In the English version she is renames to Ms. Oldwood and is voiced by Grey Griffin. 
Paty and Gloria, in 1972, 1975 and 1978: Paty (who is Chavo's age) and her aunt Gloria (who is Don Ramón's) move into the upstairs apartment. They are considered to be very beautiful and the men and boys of the vecindad immediately fall in love with them, while the women and girls get jealous of them. The 1978 Paty (Ana Lilian de la Macorra) became a regular character, appearing in many episodes of the half-hour version's last season. In the English dub version of the series, Paty and Gloria names were not changed (except Paty was given another t in her name) and were both voiced by in the animated Tara Platt, in the original Paty was voiced by Ashley Johnson and Gloria was voiced by Kaitlyn Robrock. Gloria was interpreted by Maribel Fernández in 1972, Olivia Leiva in 1975 and Regina Torné in 1978; Paty was interpreted in 1972 by Patty Juárez, Rosita Bouchot in 1975, Ana Lilian de la Macorra in 1978 and Patty Strevel in 1987.
Malicha (María Luisa Alcalá), only in 1974: Don Ramón's god-daughter. During María Antonieta de las Nieves' absence, Malicha briefly replaced her. Much like Doña Eduviges, she disappeared after a small number of episodes and was barely missed. In the English version of the series she was renamed to Molly and was voiced by Ashley Johnson. 
Don Román (Germán Robles), only in 1975: He takes Don Ramón's place in an episode of the 1975 season; he is said to be Don Ramón's cousin. In Brazil, his name was changed to Seu Madroga, being analogous to Don Ramón/Seu Madruga. In English he is known as Mr. Roman and is voiced by Jeff Bennett. 
Señor Hurtado (José Antonio Mena and Ricardo de Pascual), in 1974 and 1976: A suspicious man (actually a thief) who lives in the vecindad in a single episode conveniently named "El Ladrón De La Vecindad". His felonies are charged to Chavo by mistake (which results in everyone in the vecindad accusing El Chavo of theft, causing him to temporarily leave the vecindad in a nocturnal scene full of sorrow, thus making this one of the saddest scenes of the series), but he ultimately returns the stolen objects, restoring Chavo's innocence towards his neighbors; however, Hurtado never does claim the robberies himself. His name is reference to the Spanish word "hurtado", implying he's, in fact, a thief ("hurtar" is Spanish for "to steal"). In the English dub of the series, he is known as "Mr. Crookley" and since the English version's credits of the animated did not list the character, it is possible that he is either voiced by Kirk Thornton (who does various bit parts of the show) or Dave Mallow (judging by his voice which sounds like a combination of Manny and Beliarge). In the English dub of the original he is voiced by Carlos Alazraqui. In Brazil, his name was translated into Senhor Furtado, fitting to his surname ("furtar" is Portuguese for "to steal") very similarly to the original Spanish language and also being an actual surname in the country.
Senõr Pelonsillo (a.k.a. Señor Calvillo), only in 1976: This bald character only appears in a two-part episode called "Se Vende La Vecindad." In this episode, Sr. Barriga discovers that he has heart problems and must move to a location with a lower altitude. Senõr Pellosino thus offers to buy the vecindad, or neighborhood, from him. Everybody is against it, and had a crush on Doña Cleotilde. Fortunately, Sr. Barriga's diagnosis turned to be incorrect, and he proceeds to stay without selling to Sr. Pellosino. This character is portrayed by Ricardo de Pascual, the same actor who plays Sr. Hurtado. In the English version he is renamed to Mr. Baldman'' and is voiced by Carlos Alazraqui like Señor Hurtado.

Animated series onlyJusticiero Enmascarado (English: Secret Masked Crusader) is El Chavo's favorite wrestler and one of the favorite heroes, like El Chapulin Colorado ("Captain Hopper") in the Television, he fights enemies like vampires, zombies and wolfmen. his enemy is Furioso Desesperado ("Desperate Furious").Rubia Margot (English: Margot Blonde) is an actress of some movies and TV shows that Don Ramón (Mr. Raimond) falls in love, in the debut, Mr. Raimond is knocked out that makes an allusination to Miss Pinster as the actress. El Chavo and the gang believed that Mr. Raimond is charmed by the Witch's spells.Rufino Malacara (English: Ruffino Meanface) was played as the main villain in two episodes of season four of El Chavo animado, is original based on Señor Calvillo, he make a lie to Mr. Belliarge to be a new Neighborhood owner, he asked Chavo and the gand to find the treasure in the ground of the neighborhood after Chavo told him that there was a treasure (which turned to be Quico) that later can't cave more holes anymore, just accidentally Chavo breaks a pipe, when everyone in the neighborhood are confronting Rufino Malacara when Mr. Belliarge went away and is back when he found a true of the lie about the bank check is fake, Rufino Malacara is finally arrested by to buy the neighborhood without permission and for the destruction, and arrested by to stole keys in the car station, he's scaped but gets hit by El Chavo, and he ends up filling the holes he forced the children to make as his punishment. Fito Fuerte is the stronger action man from the episode "Caido del Cielo" when El Chavo and friend are punished by mess up the neighborhood with Mudcakes war and the adult make fault to Mr. Belliarge, so he makes favors to the kids to clean the neighborhood, Chavo sweeps the floor to make a dust nob to make scare the bird appearing an eagle to eat and accidentally break Fito Fuerte's globe and he falls to the neighborhood and help the kids how to clean the neighborhood so funny, and he makes other role appearances, like in "Viaje en el metro" featuring Justiciero Enmascarado to stop the subway train, also in the episode "Vuela Chavo" he rescues Chavo from the nest of eagles that they want to eat him.Panfilo (in the English version has no translation name, but is referred to as "the baby") is a cute baby from the episode "Baby Talk (original as "Un bebe en la vecindad) is found by Chavo and Quico outside of the neighborhood in the basket with a note saying: "Mr. Irresponsible!, why did you forget your son? Take him with you!", so they believe that the irresponsible dad left it, Chavo, junior and Quico baby sit him when Mrs. Worthmore and Miss Pinster are looking for the real irresponsible dad, but mistakenly accuse Professor Girafalde and then Mr. Raimond, when the baby escapes to the city, the neighborhood crow gets found out, so Chavo comes to rescue, when Raimond still finding until the traffic light when it's red, all cars ran over Raimond to fly away without injuries, later the parents worried that the baby is gone but finally looking at Chavo babysitting the baby and they are happy it's been found, but Mrs. Worthmore and Miss Pinster slaps the dad for his irresponsibility, the parents carrying the baby to go back home and El Chavo says goodbye and I'll miss you, but then the mother ask Chavo if he wants to babysit Panfilo's brothers and he agrees to babysit Panfilo again with his brothers. He, his brothers and the parents are making cameos in other episodes until in the episode "Viaje en el metro" they make another major role, when they ask Chavo to babysit Panfilo and the brothers again but all babies are in the subway so Chavo and friends are going to rescue but the subway gets out of the control, until at the end the babies are really fine and Chavo returns the babies to the parents and they are pleased by caring the babies, in the end when El Chavo and Mr. Raymond prefers to go in bus and gets shocked and scared to see the babies again when the episode ends.Doctor Chapatin''': based on the same character from "El Chapulin Colorado" and other Chespirito's sketches, he is an old doctor with a grumpy personality, with red scarf and with full bag that serves to hit someone by insulting him that he's old, in the animated series he made a cameo appearance in one of Manny's photos in the album, mentioned that was one of the friends, later in the season 7 episode "Quico se manchó" he make his first major role trying to cure Quico with measles, played by Jesus Gúzman.

References

External links
El Chavo complete cast and crew at Imdb.com

C
Lists of sitcom television characters
Lists of Spanish-American television series characters